The Press Enterprise is a daily newspaper published in Bloomsburg,  Pennsylvania, United States. It is owned by the parent company Press Enterprise Inc. and run by the Eyerly family. The newspaper serves a wide area including Columbia County and Montour County, along with sections of Northumberland and Luzerne counties. This includes the municipalities of Bloomsburg, Danville, Berwick, Benton, Millville, Catawissa and Elysburg.  Its editor is Peter Kendron.

News writers include Senior Reporter Leon Bogdan, and junior staffers Susan Schwartz, Geri Gibbons and Julye Wemple, as well as part-time staff. Photographers include Keith Haupt and Jimmy May, along with a stable of part-timers.

One popular feature of the paper is its "30 Seconds" section, which allows readers to call or e-mail short, anonymous messages to the paper. The messages are usually printed within a few days, sometimes with comments by the editor.

External links
 Press Enterprise

Daily newspapers published in Pennsylvania